The 1906 Michigan gubernatorial election was held on November 6, 1906. Incumbent Republican Fred M. Warner defeated Democratic candidate Charles H. Kimmerle with 60.88% of the vote.

General election

Candidates
Major party candidates
Fred M. Warner, Republican
Charles H. Kimmerle, Democratic
Other candidates
R. Clark Reed, Prohibition
James E. Walker, Socialist
Herman Richter, Socialist Labor

Results

References

1906
Michigan
Gubernatorial
November 1906 events